Bussdown may refer to:

"Bussdown", song by American rapper Maxo Kream from Punken
"Bussdown", song by Gucci Mane from Delusions of Grandeur (Gucci Mane album)
"Bussdown", song by Blueface